Blue Room may refer to:

Music
 Blue Room (Ana & Milton Popović album) (2015)
 Blue Room (Unwritten Law album) (1994)
 "Blue Room" (1926 song), a 1926 song written by Richard Rodgers and Lorenz Hart
 "Blue Room" (The Orb song), a 1992 ambient house single by The Orb
 Blue Room Released, a UK independent record label from 1994 to 2002
 Blue Room, a band that performed "Everytime You Go Away" at the end of Planes, Trains and Automobiles

Other uses
 Blue Room (White House), a room in the U.S. White House residence
 "Blue's Room", a segment of TV children show Blue's Clues
 Blue room, part of the Pepper's Ghost illusion

See also
 Blue Chamber, the chamber of the National Assembly of Quebec
 The Blue Room (disambiguation)
 Blue hall (disambiguation)